Günter Rexrodt (12 September 194119 August 2004) was a German politician. He lived in Berlin.

Education and work
After the Abitur in 1960 in Arnstadt, Thuringia and an extra year in West Berlin, he graduated with a Diplom in business studies from the Free University Berlin where he also received his doctorate ("Dr. rer. pol") in 1971. From 1968 to 1979 he worked for the chamber of commerce in Berlin. From 1979 to 1982 he worked as a ressort manager at "Office for Economy of the Federal State of Berlin".

In April 1989 he worked for Citibank in New York City and from January 1990 to August 1991 he was of the member of the board of directors of that commercial company. He changed in September 1991 to the Treuhand in Germany, where he was a member of the board of directors until January 1993. He was also a member of the Supervisory Board of the Global Panel Foundation.

Family
Rexrodt's father Wilhelm was managing director of the German Democratic Party until 1933. Wilhelm was after 1945 the co-founder of the Liberal Democratic Party of Germany.

Günter Rexrodt was married and had a son from that marriage.

In May 2004 he had to undergo a complicated surgery for cancer on the neck and died shortly after.

Party political roles
From 1980, Mr. Rexrodt was a member of the FDP (Free Democratic Party of Germany).
From 1983 to 1987 as well as from 1989 to 1994 he was the alternate state chairman as well as from 2000 to 2004 he was state chairman of the FDP Berlin.
From 1991 he was a member of the FDP board.
Since 1993 he was the federal treasurer of the FDP. In this office he was involved in the investigation of the "flyer affair" surrounding Jürgen Möllemann.
At the election to the Berlin House of Representatives in 2001 he was the lead candidate of the FDP. Under his leadership the FDP returned to the House with a final voting result of 9.9%.

Representative
From 1994 he was a member of the German Bundestag. Rexrodt was returned to the Bundestag from the Berlin list.

Public offices
From 1982 to 1985 he was the state secretary in the Authority for Economy. From 1985 to 1989 he was the Senator for Economy of the federal state of Berlin, which was led by Governing Mayor Eberhard Diepgen.

On January 21, 1993, he was ordered to be the Economics Minister of Germany under the chancellor Helmut Kohl. After the federal election of 1998 he dropped out of the Bundestag (voluntary decision). This happened on October 28, 1998.

External links
 Official Website of the Global Panel Foundation

1941 births
2004 deaths
Senators of Berlin
Members of the Abgeordnetenhaus of Berlin
Economy ministers of Germany
Members of the Bundestag for Berlin
Members of the Bundestag 2002–2005
Members of the Bundestag 1998–2002
Members of the Bundestag 1994–1998
Deaths from cancer in Germany
Commanders Crosses of the Order of Merit of the Federal Republic of Germany
Members of the Bundestag for the Free Democratic Party (Germany)